The New York State Judicial Institute is located about  north of New York City on the campus of the Pace University School of Law in White Plains, NY. Spearheaded by New York State Chief Judge Judith S. Kaye and Chief Administrative Judge Jonathan Lippman, the institute was created through a unique partnership between the New York State Courts and Pace University School of Law. The New York State Judicial Institute serves as a statewide center for the education, training, and research facility for all judges, justices, legal staff and employees of the New York State Unified Court System; It is the nation's first training and research facility for judges built by and for a state court system. The Honorable Juanita Bing Newton serves as the dean of the institute.

Jurists from not only New York but also from around the world have traveled to the institute, to participate in programs and conferences. The institute also serves as a forum where judges, lawyers, and scholars from the state, the nation and the international community can convene for events as varied as a North American symposium on environmental law, whose cosponsors included the United Nations Environment Programme, and a "Partners in Justice" colloquium, where the judiciary, law school clinical programs, and the bar explored collateral consequences of criminal convictions and ways to improve indigent representation and access to the courts.

NY LEO Fellowship 

Chief Judge Judith S. Kaye has established the New York Legal Opportunity Program (NY LEO) to help ensure a diverse legal community by promoting academic success for individuals historically under-represented in the legal profession.

THE NY LEO PROGRAM assists minority, low-income and educationally disadvantaged college graduates in acquiring the fundamental and practical skills necessary to succeed in law school. The program is available to qualified candidates who will attend law school in New York.

THE NY LEO PROGRAM is an intensive six-week summer program offered by the New York State Judicial Institute. Honorable Juanita Bing Newton, the Dean of the Judicial Institute, administers the program. Students are required to live on campus and participate in the program full-time. Experienced law professors will provide instruction in first-year law school core courses as well as in legal research, writing and analysis. As part of the program, students will have the opportunity to visit courts in session and meet with members of the judiciary and other legal professionals.

External links
New York State Judicial Institute
Pace University School of Law
Groundbreaking Ceremony
NY LEO Fellowship Program

Education in New York (state)
Education in Westchester County, New York